La Grange Park is a village in Cook County, Illinois, United States. Per the 2020 census, the population was 13,475.

Geography
La Grange Park is located at  (41.829831, -87.869233).

Demographics
As of the 2020 census there were 13,475 people, 4,917 households, and 3,576 families residing in the village. The racial makeup of the village was 80.82% White, 4.33% African American, 0.54% Native American, 2.37% Asian, 0.01% Pacific Islander, 3.50% from other races, and 8.42% from two or more races. Hispanic or Latino of any race were 11.80% of the population.

There were 4,917 households, out of which 71.18% had children under the age of 18 living with them, 60.48% were married couples living together, 10.33% had a female householder with no husband present, and 27.27% were non-families. 25.24% of all households were made up of individuals, and 15.29% had someone living alone who was 65 years of age or older. The average household size was 3.18 and the average family size was 2.62.

The village's age distribution consisted of 27.2% under the age of 18, 5.6% from 18 to 24, 23.7% from 25 to 44, 25.3% from 45 to 64, and 18.4% who were 65 years of age or older. The median age was 39.9 years. For every 100 females, there were 90.7 males. For every 100 females age 18 and over, there were 85.8 males.

The median income for a household in the village was $107,945, and the median income for a family was $136,211. Males had a median income of $76,622 versus $55,700 for females. The per capita income for the village was $49,794. About 3.6% of families and 5.1% of the population were below the poverty line, including 4.8% of those under age 18 and 8.0% of those age 65 or over.

Note: the US Census treats Hispanic/Latino as an ethnic category. This table excludes Latinos from the racial categories and assigns them to a separate category. Hispanics/Latinos can be of any race.

Government
La Grange Park is in Illinois's 5th congressional district.

The part-time Village President is James Discipio.  He is a dentist by trade and practices in Berwyn, Illinois.

Education

The Roman Catholic Archdiocese of Chicago operates Catholic schools. St. Louise de Marillac School is in LaGrange Park. The student population from circa 2019 to 2020 declined by 28. The archdiocese asked if there were interested benefactors, but the archdiocese was unsuccessful. Therefore the archdiocese decided it will close after spring 2020.

Nazareth Academy is a Roman Catholic college-preparatory high school located in LaGrange Park, Illinois, United States, in the Roman Catholic Archdiocese of Chicago. It was founded in 1900 by the Sisters of St. Joseph.

Notable people

 Allan B. Calhamer, mail carrier and game maker, invented the board game Diplomacy; grew up in La Grange Park
 Kathleen Doyle, Basketball player at the University of Iowa (2016–2020); Big Ten Player of the Year in 2020. Also a silver medalist with the US national team at the 2019 Pan American Games. WNBA draftee as 14th overall pick by Indiana Fever. Grew up in La Grange Park.
 Earl Eisenhower, Illinois state representative and brother of Dwight D. Eisenhower; lived in La Grange Park
Nick Fuentes, white supremacist, white nationalist, right-wing political commentator and activist. Leader of the Groypers
J.J. McCarthy, University of Michigan football quarterback. Born and raised in La Grange Park, attended and played football at Nazareth Academy.

References

External links

Village of La Grange Park official website
La Grange Area Historical Society
City-Data.com
Children’s Community Closet of La Grange Park

Villages in Illinois
Villages in Cook County, Illinois
Chicago metropolitan area